The Diocese of Kildare can refer to:
The Roman Catholic diocese of Kildare which is incorporated into the Roman Catholic Diocese of Kildare and Leighlin
The Church of Ireland diocese of Kildare which is incorporated into the Diocese of Meath and Kildare

See also
 Bishop of Kildare